Lokomotiv (English: Locomotive) or Lokomotiv Voluntary Sports Society (VSS) is the Russian sports club and a member of the International Railway Sports Association. Before the collapse of the Soviet Union, VSS Lokomotiv consisted of many clubs in a variety of sports which were all named "Lokomotiv" with an addition of the town/city name from which the club was from (f.e. Lokomotiv Moscow). In the Eastern Bloc countries many teams associated with the railway industry (but not part of VSS Lokomotiv) were also named or renamed "Lokomotiv".

Sport clubs of the Lokomotiv society
FC Lokomotiv Moscow
RC Lokomotiv Moscow
FC Lokomotiv Nizhny Novgorod
Lokomotiv Orenburg
Lokomotiv Penza
Lokomotiv Yaroslavl
PBC Lokomotiv Kuban
FC Lokomotyv Kyiv
FC Lokomotyv Kharkiv
FC Lokomotivi Tbilisi
Jõhvi FC Lokomotiv

Notable members
Vera Krepkina (athletics)
Nikolay Sokolov (athletics)
Boris Spassky (chess)
Radia Yeroshina (cross-country skiing)
Viatcheslav Ekimov (cycling)
Ludmila Belousova (figure skating)
Oleg Protopopov (figure skating)
Lidia Skoblikova (speed skating)
Vladimir Bure (swimming)
Yurik Vardanyan (weightlifting)

See also
 Rail transport in the Soviet Union

References

External links
Official website
 Sport Flags of the USSR
International fitness-sports societies at the Great Soviet Encyclopedia
International Railway Sports Association

 
Sport societies in the Soviet Union
1999 establishments in Russia
Rail transport in Russia
Multi-sport clubs in Russia
Rail transport in the Soviet Union